Ingeborg Aigner-Weichert (born 30 January 1943) is an Austrian sprinter. She competed in the women's 100 metres at the 1964 Summer Olympics.

References

External links
 

1943 births
Living people
Athletes (track and field) at the 1964 Summer Olympics
Athletes (track and field) at the 1968 Summer Olympics
Austrian female sprinters
Austrian female hurdlers
Olympic athletes of Austria